TVOD may refer to:

TVoD, transactional video on demand
TV OD, a 2014 ITV2 British satire comedy show
TVöD, a grade of academic ranks in Germany
"TVOD", a 2006 song by Tigertailz from the album Bezerk 2.0
"T.V.O.D.", a 1978 song by the Normal